The men's normal hill individual ski jumping competition for the 1968 Winter Olympics was held at Autrans. It occurred on 11 February.

Results

References

Ski jumping at the 1968 Winter Olympics